Sandra Pires Tavares (born June 16, 1973, in Rio de Janeiro) is a female beach volleyball player from Brazil, who won the gold medal in the inaugural women's beach volleyball tournament at the 1996 Summer Olympics, partnering Jackie Silva.

She also represented her native country at the 2000 Summer Olympics in Sydney, Australia, where she claimed the bronze medal, teaming up with Adriana Samuel.

References

 Career profile at the Beach Volleyball Database

External links

1973 births
Living people
Brazilian women's beach volleyball players
Beach volleyball players at the 1996 Summer Olympics
Beach volleyball players at the 2000 Summer Olympics
Beach volleyball players at the 2004 Summer Olympics
Olympic beach volleyball players of Brazil
Olympic gold medalists for Brazil
Olympic bronze medalists for Brazil
Olympic medalists in beach volleyball
Volleyball players from Rio de Janeiro (city)
Medalists at the 2000 Summer Olympics
Medalists at the 1996 Summer Olympics
21st-century Brazilian women